The 2016 North Alabama Lions football team represented the University of North Alabama during the 2016 NCAA Division II football season. They were led by head coach Bobby Wallace, who was in his 15th season at North Alabama. The Lions played their home games at Braly Municipal Stadium and were members of the Gulf South Conference.

Schedule
North Alabama announced its 2016 football schedule on February 9, 2016. The schedule consists of both five home and away games in the regular season. The Lions will host GSC foes Shorter, Valdosta State, West Florida, and West Georgia, and will travel to Delta State, Florida Tech, Mississippi College, and West Alabama.

The Lions hosted both non-conference games against Jacksonville State of the Ohio Valley Conference and North Greenville which is independent from a conference.

The game between Florida Tech and North Alabama was cancelled in advance of the arrival of Hurricane Matthew.

References

North Alabama
North Alabama Lions football seasons
Gulf South Conference football champion seasons
North Alabama Lions football